"Get Drunk and Be Somebody" is a song co-written and recorded by American country music artist Toby Keith. It was released in December 2005 as the first single from Keith's album White Trash with Money. It was also his first single for Show Dog Nashville. It peaked at number 3 on the country singles charts. Keith wrote the song with Scotty Emerick.

Content
This song is a typical working man's anthem in which two workers who are depressed by their mundane jobs celebrate on Friday by drinking.

Music video
The live music video was directed by Michael Salomon and premiered on CMT on February 15, 2006. GAC cut the ending of the video out because of its suggestive language Keith tells the audience, referring to him shooting the video as part of the concert. During the bridge of the song, the lyrics pop up on screen, so the crowd can sing along.  It is a live performance clip that was filmed at a concert in Portland, Oregon at the Rose Garden Arena now named Moda Center.

Chart positions
"Get Drunk and Be Somebody" debuted at number 32 on the U.S. Billboard Hot Country Singles & Tracks.

Year-end charts

References

2005 singles
2005 songs
Toby Keith songs
Songs written by Scotty Emerick
Songs written by Toby Keith
Show Dog-Universal Music singles
Music videos directed by Michael Salomon
Songs about alcohol